Trdelník (or rarely trdlo or trozkol) is a kind of spit cake.  It is made from rolled dough that is wrapped around a stick, then grilled and topped with sugar and walnut mix.

Origin

Trdelník has several origins. In the mid-19th century it was known as a Slovak dish, and in the 20th century as a Moravian dish. A similar pastry was also popular in the Hungarian speaking part of Transylvania (in today's Romania), where it is called kürtőskalács. The word trdelník is of Czech-Slovak origin; the root of this word, trdlo, is the name of the wooden tool the cake ingredients are wrapped around during cooking (which gives it its traditional hollow shape), and can also mean "simpleton" in English (see trdlo).

In the 21st century it became popular among tourists in the Czech Republic, Hungary and Slovakia. 
Nowadays, trdelník is very popular among tourists as a sweet pastry in many countries, mostly in the Czech Republic. A variation of trdelník with an ice cream filling was popularized by Prague cafés.

The version from the Slovak town of Skalica (Skalický trdelník) was registered in December 2007 as a PGI (protected geographical indication) in the European Union. The registration application with the detailed description of the product was published in April 2007 in the Official Journal of the European Union.
In 2015 it's become a traditional Hungarian dish.

Tourism in Prague 
Although trdelník is usually presented as "a traditional Czech cake" or "the old Bohemian pastry", and mentions of "český trdelník" can be found in 20th century literature, trdelník is mostly mentioned in literature as a Slovak or Moravian, not Bohemian dish, and the mass spread of this dessert in Prague is recognized to have started more recently. Czech cinematographer and reporter Janek Rubeš argues that trdelník is only made for tourists, and that even the hamburger is more traditional in the Czech Republic.

Skalický trdelník 

The production of trdelník has a long tradition in the Slovak town of Skalica near the border with the Moravian town Hodonín. The original recipe was owned at the end of the 18th century by the cook of poet József Gvadányi, a retired Hungarian general and resident of Skalica. The original recipe then was improved by the inhabitants of Skalica to its final form now known as Skalický trdelník.

The society Skalický trdelník was founded in 2004 with the goal of keeping the tradition of the original open fire Trdelník production.

See also
 List of spit-roasted foods

References

External links
 History of trdelník

Hungarian cuisine
Slovak cuisine
Czech cuisine
Romanian cuisine
Articles containing video clips
Spit cakes